Sir Andrew Marshall Horsbrugh-Porter, 3rd Baronet,  (1907–1986) was a British Army officer and one of the Horsbrugh-Porter Baronets. He was born in 1907 and grew up at  Newbay House, Co Wexford, Ireland, the home of the Jefferies family, his maternal grandparents.

During the Second World War, he was awarded the Distinguished Service Order for gallantry whilst serving as a Captain in the 12th Lancers during the Dunkirk evacuation. He commanded his squadron 'with the greatest dash and energy so he obtained much invaluable information'. Around Saint-Omer on 23 May, he and his men checked the German advance despite being wounded himself.

Horsbrugh-Porter later achieved the rank of lieutenant-colonel and helped establish the 27th Lancers (known as 'Porterforce') and, this amalgamation of various units, were active in the liberation of Italy most notably at Ravenna.  

Later, he was the hunting editor of The Field Magazine from 1958 to 1971 and The Times polo correspondent during the 1960s and 70s. He was an international polo player who held an 8 goal handicap. He was married to Annette Mary Browne-Clayton.

Arms

References 

1986 deaths
English polo players
Companions of the Distinguished Service Order
Roehampton Trophy
1907 births
English people of Irish descent
Baronets in the Baronetage of the United Kingdom
12th Royal Lancers officers
British Army personnel of World War II
Graduates of the Royal Military College, Sandhurst